The 25th annual Berlin International Film Festival was held from 27 June – 8 July 1975. The Golden Bear was awarded to the Hungarian film Adoption directed by Márta Mészáros. The retrospective dedicated to Greta Garbo was shown at the festival.

Jury
The following people were announced as being on the jury for the festival:
 Sylvia Syms, actress (United Kingdom) - Jury President
 Ottokar Runze, director, screenwriter and producer (West Germany)
 Henry Chapier, director, screenwriter and film critic (France)
 Else Goelz, journalist (West Germany)
 Albert J. Johnson, film critic (United States)
 Rostislav Yurenev, film critic (Soviet Union)
 João Carlos Martins, pianist and conductor (Brazil)
 Sukhdev Sandhu, director (India)

Films in competition
The following films were in competition for the Golden Bear award:

Out of competition
 Portrait of Fidel, directed by Gina Lollobrigida (Italy)
 יהיה טוב סלומוניקו Yi'ihiyeh Tov Salmonico, directed by Alfred Steinhardt (Israel)

Key
{| class="wikitable" width="550" colspan="1"
| style="background:#FFDEAD;" align="center"| †
|Winner of the main award for best film in its section
|}

Awards
The following prizes were awarded by the Jury:
 Golden Bear: Adoption by Márta Mészáros
 Silver Bear – Special Jury Prize:
 Dupont Lajoie by Yves Boisset
 Overlord by Stuart Cooper
 Silver Bear for Best Director: Sergei Solovyov for Sto dney posle detstva
 Silver Bear for Best Actress: Kinuyo Tanaka for Sandakan hachibanshokan bohkyo
 Silver Bear for Best Actor: Vlastimil Brodský for Jakob der Lügner
 Silver Bear for an outstanding artistic contribution: Woody Allen for Love and Death
FIPRESCI Award
Far from Home by Sohrab Shahid-Saless

References

External links
25th Berlin International Film Festival 1975
1975 Berlin International Film Festival
Berlin International Film Festival:1975 at Internet Movie Database

25
1975 film festivals
1975 in West Germany
1970s in West Berlin